Prithvi Subba Gurung is a Nepalese politician and former Chief Minister of Gandaki Province, a province in western Nepal. He is presently the leader of opposition in Gandaki. He was member of the 1st Nepalese Constituent Assembly and Minister of Culture, Tourism and Civil Aviation, Nepal. He was unanimously selected Parliamentary Party leader of CPN (UML) for Gandaki Province on 11 February 2018.

He was appointed as the chief minister, according to Article 168 (1) of the Constitution of Nepal and took the oath of his office and secrecy as a chief minister on 16 February 2018. As of 9 May 2021, he resigned from the post after losing majority and hence his resignation was approved by the governor.

Early life
Prithvi Subba Gurung was born in Gilung (now Kwhlosothar) Lamjung, Nepal to Ganga Prasad Gurung and Chini Gurung.

He studied in Amrit Science Campus (ASCOL), Kathmandu, Nepal.

Foreign visits 
 India
 Thailand
 Malaysia
 Singapore
 Hong Kong
 Macau
 China
 South Korea
 Japan
 United States
 Spain
 Sweden
 Denmark
 Netherlands
 Norway
 Canada
 Bolivia
 Guatemala
 Peru
 Ethiopia
 Bahrain
 Qatar
 United Arab Emirates

References

Living people
Communist Party of Nepal (Unified Marxist–Leninist) politicians
People from Lamjung District
1958 births
Members of the Provincial Assembly of Gandaki Province
Chief Ministers of Nepalese provinces
Gurung people

Members of the 1st Nepalese Constituent Assembly
Nepal MPs 2022–present